Ben H. Shepherd is a British historian and author who specialises in German military history of World War II. He has authored several books on the German Army of 1935–1945. Shepherd holds the position of reader in history at the Glasgow Caledonian University.

Shepherd's latest work is Hitler's Soldiers: The German Army in the Third Reich, published by Yale University Press in 2016. The historian Robert M. Citino describes it as a "rich and satisfying book" due to its focus on the operational history of the German Army, as well as on its ideological and criminal aspects. One of Shepherd's prior works, War in the Wild East, focused on the German security warfare on the Eastern Front (World War II).

Publications

References

British historians
Alumni of the University of Birmingham
Living people
Military historians
Historians of World War II
Year of birth missing (living people)